Shark cartilage is a dietary supplement made from the dried and powdered cartilage of a shark; that is, from the tough material that composes a shark's skeleton. Shark cartilage is marketed under a variety of brand names, including Carticin, Cartilade, or BeneFin, and is marketed explicitly or implicitly as a treatment or preventive for various illnesses, including cancer.

There is no scientific evidence that shark cartilage is useful in treating or preventing cancer or other diseases. Controlled trials have shown no benefit to shark cartilage supplements, and shark cartilage contains potentially toxic compounds linked to Alzheimer's disease and amyotrophic lateral sclerosis. However, shark cartilage supplements are still marketed using the misconception that sharks do not get cancer, a myth that was as popularized by the 1992 book Sharks Don't Get Cancer.  In the United States, the Federal Trade Commission has taken legal action against such fraudulent promoters.

Tumors of many kinds, some metastatic, have been found in numerous species of sharks. The first shark tumor was recorded in 1908. Scientists have since discovered 40 benign and cancerous tumors in 18 of the 1,168 species of sharks.  Scarcity of studies on shark physiology has perhaps allowed the myth to be accepted as fact for so many years. Numerous cancers in sharks, including tumors in shark cartilage, were documented by Gary Ostrander and his colleagues from the University of Hawaii in research published in 2004.

The ongoing consumption of shark cartilage supplements has been linked to a significant decline in shark populations and the popularity of these supplements has been described as a triumph of pseudoscience and marketing over scientific evaluation.

Lack of evidence for effectiveness

Manufacturers of shark cartilage supplements provide anecdotal testimonials from those who claim to have experienced relief from arthritis symptoms and pain, as a result of taking shark cartilage supplements.

Opponents cite existing studies of shark cartilage on a variety of cancers that produced negligible to non-existent results in the prevention or treatment of cancer. Most notable among these was a breast-cancer trial conducted by the Mayo Clinic that stated that the trial "was unable to demonstrate any suggestion of efficacy for this shark cartilage product in patients with advanced cancer."  The results of another clinical trial were presented at the 43rd annual meeting of the American Society of Clinical Oncology. In that study, sponsored by the National Cancer Institute, "researchers did not find a statistical difference in survival" between patients receiving shark cartilage and those taking a placebo. Scientific evidence does not support the efficacy of shark cartilage nor the ability of effective components to remove cancer cells. The fact that people believe eating shark cartilage can cure cancer shows the serious potential impacts of pseudoscience.

Detractors also claim that previous beliefs in regards to sharks and cancer have been overturned, as forty-two varieties of cancer have now been discovered in sharks and related species.  Also, many opponents feel that non-existent (or even limited) results do not justify the rampant over-fishing of many endangered species of sharks, further threatening their extinction.

Legal action
In the summer of 2004, Lane Labs, the manufacturers of BeneFin, was ordered to cease the promotion of BeneFin as a treatment or cure for cancer, as they had not conducted any research as to their claims for the product, much less reported any potential side effects.  Thus, the FDA ordered Lane Labs to "pay restitution to all of its customers from September of 1999 to the present."

See also
List of unproven and disproven cancer treatments
Shark finning

References

External links
 Information on shark cartilage, from WebMD.com

Dietary supplements
Sharks
Alternative cancer treatments